Rakim or Rakeem is an Arabic-language name, that is commonly given to African American males. It may be influenced by Karim, Rahim, and Hakim.

It may refer to:

In religion
Al Rakim, a legendary dog that guarded the Seven Sleepers in Islam

People with the given name
Rakim Allen or PnB Rock (1991–2022), American rapper
Rakim Cox (born 1991) Canadian football player
Rakim Hollis (born 1980) American basketball player
Rakim Jarrett, American football player
Rakim Mayers or ASAP Rocky (born 1988), American rapper
Rakim Sanders (born 1989), American basketball player
Rakeem Boyd (born 1998), American football player
Rakeem Buckles (born 1990), American professional basketball player
Rakeem Cato (born 1992), American football player
Rakeem Christmas (born 1991), American basketball player
Rakeem Nuñez-Roches (born 1993), Belizean-American football player

People with the surname
Mustafa Râkim, (1757–1826), Ottoman calligrapher
Dionne Rakeem, British singer

Fictional characters
Rakeem Powell, NYPD Detective in James Patterson's Alex Cross novel Cross

Others
Rakim or Rakim Allah (born 1968), American rapper
R.K.M & Ken-Y member José Nieves originally went by "Rakim" before changing it to avoid confusion with the rapper
RZA, originally went by stagename Prince Rakeem, releasing the 1991 album Ooh I Love You Rakeem under that name

References

Arabic masculine given names
Surnames of Turkish origin
Surnames of Arabic origin